The Chorna, Chyornaya or Chorhun (Chorna, Chyornaya), which translates from the Ukrainian and Russian as "Black River", is a small river in southern Crimea. It is 34.5 km long.

The Chorna River begins in the Baydar Valley northeast of the small town of Rodnikivs'ke (44° 28' N  33° 51' EG), just west of which it flows into a reservoir.  From there it continues in a westerly direction to the town of Inkerman (Belokamensk) where it enters the Bay of Sevastopol, on the southwest coast of the Crimean peninsula.

Inkerman was a key location during the Crimean War of 1853–1856 and the Chorna lends its name to the Battle of Chornaya River of 1855.  

Rivers of Crimea